Sweet Home or Sweethome may refer to:

Places in the United States
 Sweet Home, Arkansas
 Sweet Home Central School District in Amherst and Tonawanda, New York
 Sweet Home High School (Amherst, New York), a New York State public high school
 Sweet Home High School (Oregon), a public high school in Sweet Home, Oregon, United States
 Sweet Home Mine in Colorado
 Sweet Home, Oregon
 Sweet Home, Lavaca County, Texas
 Sweet Home Independent School District, a public school district based in the community of Sweet Home, Texas (USA)
 Sweethome, Oklahoma

Entertainment
 Sweet Home (1989 film), a Japanese horror film
 Sweet Home (video game), a 1989 role-playing video game based on the film
 Sweet Home (webtoon), a South Korean horror-apocalyptic webtoon by Kim Carnby and Hwang Young-chan
 Sweet Home (TV series), a South Korean television series based from the webtoon
 Sweet Home (2015 film), a Spanish-Polish horror film
 "Sweet Home Alabama", a 1974 song by Southern rock band Lynyrd Skynyrd
 "Sweet Home Chicago", a 1936 popular blues song
 Sweet Home, a fictional slave plantation from Toni Morrison's Beloved

Other uses
 Sweet Home 3D, a floorplan editor for a house, with 3D previews